Daniel Sobel FRSA (born 14 July 1975) is a consultant in the field of Inclusion (education), a teacher and mentor at Immanuel College, Bushey, and a SENCO and assistant head at King Solomon High School. He began working part-time as a freelance consultant on inclusion for the Borough of Redbridge, promoting good practice through his articles. In 2014, he established the company Inclusion Expert to continue this work.

As Inclusion Expert’s founder, Sobel has advised the DfE, the EU and governments abroad. Daniel is a public speaker, writes for publications including Headteacher Update and The Guardian, and is the author of several books including Narrowing the Attainment Gap and wellbeing focused Leading on Pastoral Care.

Sobel left school with no A Levels and read his first book aged 18. He secured a place on a Master’s course in Education Psychology and went on to take four graduate courses in Psychology and Education, eventually running out of money in the middle of doctoral training.

Sobel moved to full time teaching and became a SENCO. Dismayed by how much of the job was pointless meetings and paperwork, he started designing tools to better support his students. During a stint as Assistant Head he continued to develop simple systems to help teachers manage information and maximise the impact of their interventions.

Sobel then left teaching to form Inclusion Expert.

Articles
Sobel writes a regular column for The Guardian and has also written for the Times Educational Supplement, Optimus Education, SecEd, Headteacher Update and The Jewish Chronicle. He focuses on the topics of the Pupil Premium, Special Educational Needs, and Inclusion in schools and the wider community.

References

Living people
1975 births